Preston North was a parliamentary constituency in Lancashire, which returned one Member of Parliament (MP) to the House of Commons of the Parliament of the United Kingdom. The constituency was created by the House of Commons (Redistribution of Seats) Act 1949 for the 1950 general election by division of the former two-seat Preston constituency, and abolished for the 1983 general election. Some of the constituency's former territory was then incorporated within a new single-seat Preston constituency, and parts of Preston North became elements within Fylde and Ribble Valley.

The modern Preston is a safe seat for Labour, but historically Preston North was one of the most marginal constituencies in the country.

Boundaries
1950–1974:  The County Borough of Preston wards of Deepdale, Fishwick, Moorbrook, Park, and Ribbleton, and the Urban District of Fulwood.

1974–1983:  The County Borough of Preston wards of Deepdale, Fishwick, Moorbrook, Park, St Matthew's, and Ribbleton, and the Urban District of Fulwood. The constituency boundaries remained unchanged.

Members of Parliament

 Ronald Atkins (Labour) and Robert Atkins (Conservative) are unrelated.

Election results

Elections in the 1950s

Elections in the 1960s

Elections in the 1970s

See also
Wyre and Preston North
Preston (UK Parliament constituency)
Ribble Valley

References 

Parliamentary constituencies in North West England (historic)
Constituencies of the Parliament of the United Kingdom established in 1950
Constituencies of the Parliament of the United Kingdom disestablished in 1983
Politics of Preston